Men's Giant Slalom World Cup 1991/1992

Calendar

Final point standings

In Men's Giant Slalom World Cup 1991/92 all results count.

References
 fis-ski.com

World Cup
FIS Alpine Ski World Cup men's giant slalom discipline titles